Nedunjeliyan I was a Pandya king. He was also known as Arya Padai Kadantha Nedunchezhiyan

Archaeological evidence 
His name is present in the Mangulam inscriptions of 3rd century BCE. The inscriptions mentions that workers of Nedunjeliyan I, a Pandyan king of Sangam period, made stone beds for Jain monks.

In popular culture 
Nedunjeliyan I was also the Pandya king of the epic Silappatikaram authored by the Sangam poet Ilango Adigal who later died of a broken heart along with his queen consort Kopperundevi.

He is portrayed by O. A. K. Thevar in the film Poompuhar (1964).

See also
 List of Sangam poets

Notes

References

Further reading 
 

Pandyan kings
2nd-century Indian monarchs